Joseph Bernard Rogers (July 8, 1964 – October 7, 2013) was an American politician served as the 45th Lieutenant Governor of Colorado from 1999 to 2003.

Early life and education
Rogers was born on July 8, 1964, in Omaha, Nebraska to Joe Louis Rogers and Lola Marie Rogers. He later moved with his family to Colorado, and was raised in Commerce City. He earned a Bachelor of Arts degree from Colorado State University and Juris Doctor from the Arizona State University College of Law. Rogers was a member of Alpha Phi Alpha fraternity.

Career
As an attorney, Rogers practiced law in Colorado and served as staff counsel to U.S. Senator Hank Brown. In 1996, Rogers ran for Colorado's 1st congressional district as a Republican, gaining 42% of the vote.

In 1998, he was elected the second black lieutenant governor of Colorado after George L. Brown, who served from 1975 to 1979. As lieutenant governor, Rogers was a principal speaker at the 2000 Republican National Convention. Personal and political conflicts with his running mate, Governor Bill Owens, kept him off the reelection ticket in 2002. Issues that strained their professional relationship included disagreements over spending and funeral arrangements for Vikki Buckley, the former state Secretary of State.

Rogers instead ran in the newly created 7th congressional district, but placed last out of four in the Republican primary, receiving just 13% of the vote, behind the eventual winner in the general election, Bob Beauprez.

Death 
Rogers died after being admitted to the hospital due to back pains on October 7, 2013. After his death, he was honored by Owens, who he served under as lieutenant governor.

See also 
 List of minority governors and lieutenant governors in the United States

References

External links
 

1964 births
2013 deaths
Politicians from Omaha, Nebraska
Colorado State University alumni
Sandra Day O'Connor College of Law alumni
Colorado lawyers
Lieutenant Governors of Colorado
Colorado Republicans
African-American people in Colorado politics
Burials at Fairmount Cemetery (Denver, Colorado)
Lawyers from Omaha, Nebraska
20th-century American lawyers
20th-century African-American people
21st-century African-American people
Black conservatism in the United States